Saint Humbert may refer to:

Humbert of Maroilles (d. 680), Frankish saint
Emebert or Ablebert (8th century)
Humbertus (d. 870), bishop of Elmham.
Humbert III of Savoy, called Blessed, or The Saint